Chynna or Chyna can be both a given name and surname. Notable people with the name include:

 Chyna (1969–2016), American professional wrestler, actress, glamour model, and bodybuilder
 Chynna Clugston Flores (born 1975), American comic book creator
 Chynna Ortaleza (born 1982), Filipino actress, television host, and model
 Chyna Layne, American-born Jamaican actress
 Chynna Phillips (born 1968), American singer and actor
 Chynna Rogers (1994–2020), American rapper and model
 Blac Chyna (born 1988), American model and entrepreneur

See also
 China (disambiguation), includes a list of people with the name China
 Chyna Doll (disambiguation)